The New Will Never Wear Off Of You is a country album by Crash Craddock. It was released on Capitol Records in 1982.

Track listing
Love Busted
I Want Some
Next Stop Love
Odette
I Just Need You for Tonight
The New Will Never Wear Off of You
Part of Me That Needs You Most
I Can't Get Over Getting Over You
Looking Back
Darlin' Take Care of Yourself

References 

Billy "Crash" Craddock albums
1982 albums